Peter Boamah Otokunor is a Ghanaian politician and an agricultural economist. He is a member of the National Democratic Congress (NDC) and the deputy General Secretary of the party

Education 
Boamah holds a PhD in Agric Economics and Policy and Bsc. in Agriculture from the University of Ghana. He also holds a PHD in Finance from SMC University

Politics 
In 2018, Boamah was elected as the Deputy General Secretary of the National Democratic Congress.

References 

National Democratic Congress (Ghana) politicians
Living people
University of Ghana alumni
Year of birth missing (living people)